"" ("A ship is coming, laden"), is an Advent season chorale and Marian Hymn. It is one of the oldest religious songs of German origin.

History 
The oldest existing text source is a manuscript dated before 1450. It was found in the Strasbourg Dominican convent of St. Nikolaus in undis. Due to the fact that the mystic Johannes Tauler visited this convent frequently, the lyrics of this song are attributed to him. Reference is the word "enphohet" (received) which is characteristically used by Tauler very often.

The lyrics are typical for the allegory in the Middle Ages as a vital element in the synthesis of biblical and classical traditions. Biblical motifs compare the pregnant Virgin Mary with a loaded entering ship. The ship is set in motion under sail (correspondent to love) and mast (correspondent to the Holy Spirit).

The oldest source of the melody is included in Andernacher Hymns (1608). The song is found there in bilingual text under the title "" as well as the Latin "".

Lyrics

Melody

c.f. = cantus firmus

Musical setting 
Max Reger quotes the tune in his organ pieces Sieben Stücke, Op. 145.

See also
 List of Christmas carols

References

External links 

 "A ship is coming laden", English translation by Alan and Enid Luff
 Score
 Michael Fischer: Es kommt ein Schiff geladen. Ausführlicher Kommentar zur Liedgeschichte May 2005.  (PDF, 1.11 MB)
 Es kommt ein Schiff, geladen, text in old German and Latin, by lyrik-und-lied.de
 "Es kommt ein Schiff, geladen" Carus-Verlag and SWR2 
 "Es kommt ein Schiff, geladen" music in lieder-archiv.de
 , arrangement by Max Reger, Cantamus Choir, Gießen
 , Fantasia for Organ by C. Meise, Bielefeld, Germany

German-language Christmas carols
Christmas in Germany
Advent songs
Hymn tunes
Marian hymns
German Christian hymns
15th-century hymns